Minnajima can refer to:
 Minnajima (Motobu, Okinawa) within Motobu, Kunigami District, Okinawa Prefecture, Japan
 Minnajima (Tarama, Okinawa) within Tarama, Miyako District, Okinawa Prefecture, Japan